Abhijai Mansingh (born 17 April 1997) is a West Indian cricketer. He made his List A debut on 9 November 2019, for Combined Campuses and Colleges in the 2019–20 Regional Super50 tournament. He was in the Jamaica Tallawahs squad for the 2021 Caribbean Premier League season, but did not play any games.

References

External links
 

1997 births
Living people
Combined Campuses and Colleges cricketers
Place of birth missing (living people)